The Ocean Affairs Council is the official governing body in Taiwan (Republic of China) under the Executive Yuan in charge of the planning, coordination and implementation of marine-related policies.

History
The Organization Act of the Ocean Affairs Council was formulated and promulgated on 1 July 2015. It was initially planned to be inaugurated in July 2016 but was delayed due to disagreements in the Legislative Yuan. The council was eventually inaugurated on 28 April 2018 by Premier William Lai.

In December 2020 the Ocean Affairs Council it was clarified that in the event of an attack on a Coast Guard vessel the head of the Ocean Affairs Council has the right to order them to return fire. In the event that communications with headquarters are blocked then the highest ranking local officer can make the decision to return fire.

Organizational structures
 Coast Guard Administration
 National Academy of Marine Research
 Ocean Conservation Administration
 Taiwan Ocean Research Institute

Chairpersons

See also
 Maritime industries of Taiwan

References

External links

 

2018 establishments in Taiwan
Executive Yuan
Organizations based in Kaohsiung
Government agencies established in 2018
Maritime affairs ministries